The 2022–23 North Dakota State Bison men's basketball team represents North Dakota State University during the 2022-23 NCAA Division I men's basketball season. The Bison, led by ninth year head coach David Richman, play their home games at the Scheels Center, as members of the Summit League.
The Bison went into the Summit League tournament as the number 3 seed. They beat South Dakota and South Dakota State before falling to Oral Roberts in the championship game.

Previous Season
The Bison finished the 2021–22 season 23–10, 13–5 in Summit League play to finish in second place. In the Summit League tournament, they defeated Denver in the quarterfinals, Oral Roberts in the semifinals, before losing to South Dakota State in the finals.

Offseason

Departures

Sources:

Incoming transfers

2022 recruiting class

Roster

Schedule and results

|-
!colspan=12 style=| Exhibition

|-
!colspan=12 style=| Non-conference regular season

|-
!colspan=9 style=| Summit League regular season

|-
!colspan=9 style=|Summit League tournament

Sources:

Awards and Accolades

Summit League Player of the Week

All-League Awards

Source:

All-Summit League First Team
Grant Nelson

All-Summit League Honorable Mention
Boden Skunberg

All-Summit League Defensive Team
Grant Nelson

All-Tournament Team
Grant Nelson
Boden Skunberg
Source:

References

North Dakota State Bison men's basketball seasons
North Dakota State Bison
North Dakota State Bison men's basketball
North Dakota State Bison men's basketball